Gibson Bay is an arm of the Foxe Basin in the Qikiqtaaluk Region of Nunavut, Canada. It is located on the northern coast of Foxe Peninsula, in western Baffin Island. It is fed by the Kommanik River whose headwaters are at Kavivan Lake,  to the southeast. Within the bay, there is a small island chain.

References

Bays of Foxe Basin